Bettye Kimbrell (born November 22, 1936) is a master folk artist for quilting, and one of the charter members of the North Jefferson Quilter's Guild in Mount Olive, Alabama.

In 1995 Kimbrell won the  Alabama Folk Heritage Award, the highest honor for the traditional arts in Alabama.  Kimbrell received national attention in 2008 when she was one of eleven folk artists to receive the National Heritage Fellowship from the National Endowment for the Arts, the highest honor in the folk and traditional arts in the United States. Her quilts have been exhibited at the Birmingham Museum of Art (2008), have toured five cities in Belgium in the "Schatten van/in Mensen" exhibit (2010–11), and were displayed in five cities in China as part of an exhibit sponsored by the United States Embassy (2012-2013).

Her art
Kimbrell is known for her intricate needlework and detailed quilting. She uses traditional techniques such as trapunto, broderie perse and leaf pounding in her work and creates her own designs along with traditional patterns.

Biography
Kimbrell grew up with her father and grandparents on a farm in Fayette County, Alabama in the late 1930s and early 1940s. She was the oldest of five children. Her grandmother taught her to quilt when she was 10 because she believed "idle hands are the devil's workshop". They made string quilts—using scraps of square fabric for the top, feed and fertilizer sacks for the back, and cotton from their farm for the batting, with string ties every few inches to hold them together.

She married Calvin Kimbrell and moved to Mount Olive, Alabama. In the 1960s a friend gave her name to Loveman's Department Store in Birmingham for directing customers to get their quilts finished. Finishing all different types and designs of quilts got Kimbrell interested in quilting as an art and not just as a utilitarian need.

In the early 1970s Kimbrell won her first blue ribbon for quilting and describes this event as the "spark that lit the fire". Before this time she had been raising five children and taking care of her youngest sister, who had polio, and didn't have time to devote to quilting as a hobby. In 1979 Kimbrell organized a quilt show for the Mount Olive community center, and out of this event came the North Jefferson Quilter's Guild.

Kimbrell has been an active member of Quilt Alabama and has been a master folk artist for the Alabama Folk Council for the Arts' folk arts apprenticeship program. She has also been a featured artist at the Alabama Folklife Festival, the Alabama Sampler portion of the Birmingham festival, City Stages, and the Kentuck Festival in Northport, Alabama.  Kimbrell also has taught quilting classes at the John C. Campbell Folk School in Brasstown, North Carolina, and at the Alabama Folk School at Camp McDowell in Nauvoo, Alabama.  When not working on her own quilts Kimbrell has taken up the challenging work of restoring old quilts.

References

Further reading
. Companion Website, featuring Kimbrell's quilts.

External links
 APT's (Alabama Public Television) Alabama Craft: Tradition and Innovation four episodes with Bettye Kimbrell
 Interview by Mary Eckstein for the NEA an interview with Bettye Kimbrell

American textile artists
Artists from Alabama
Quilters
Living people
People from Fayette County, Alabama
People from Jefferson County, Alabama
1936 births
Women textile artists
National Heritage Fellowship winners